The Royal Aircraft Establishment Larynx (from "Long Range Gun with Lynx engine") was an early British pilotless aircraft, to be used as a guided anti-ship weapon. Started in September 1925, it was an early cruise missile guided by an autopilot.

Design
A small monoplane powered by a  Armstrong Siddeley Lynx IV engine, it had a top speed of 200 mph (320 km/h), faster than contemporary fighters.

It used autopilot principles developed by Professor Archibald Low and already used in the Ruston Proctor AT, a radio controlled biplane that was intended to be used against German Zeppelin bombers.

Project history
 First test 20 July 1927. Launched from cordite-powered catapult fitted to the S class destroyer . Crashed into Bristol Channel.
 Second test 1 September 1927. Thought to have flown 100 miles (160 km) and was then lost.
 Third test 15 October 1927. 112 mile (180 km) flight, hit five miles from target.
 Two launches May 1929.  Launched from land, one overflew target and other was successful.

Specifications

See also
 Hewitt-Sperry Automatic Airplane
 Kettering Bug
 V-1 flying bomb

References

External links
 (1.0) The Aerial Torpedo
 Remote Piloted Aerial Vehicles : The 'Aerial Target' and 'Aerial Torpedo' in Britain
 Interwar British Experiments with Pilotless Aircraft pay to access
 "Automatic Flight" a 1958 Flight article
 The Mother of All Drones - Article Vintage Wings of Canada 

Cancelled military aircraft projects of the United Kingdom
Unmanned military aircraft of the United Kingdom
Guided missiles of the United Kingdom
Aircraft manufactured in the United Kingdom
Single-engined tractor aircraft
Mid-wing aircraft
Aircraft first flown in 1927